Salvador Ysart (born 1878, Barcelona, Spain, d. 1955 Scotland) was a glassblower who came to work at the Moncrieff glassworks in Perth, Scotland, in 1922 where he designed and produced a range of art glasswares called Monart .

Life and career

Originally from Barcelona, Salvador worked at the Schneider Art Glass factory in France. In 1915 he moved to Scotland with his family where he was recruited to teach light bulb glassblowing at Leith Flint Glassworks in Edinburgh. In 1922 he moved to the Moncrieff glassworks in Perth, initially to make laboratory glassware with his eldest son Paul (1904–1991). Producing ‘friggers’ (hobby pieces) in their spare time, they were encouraged to produce art pieces and by 1924 had produced a range of decorative glasswares under the name of Monart (from MONcrieff and YsART). By the 1930s, their pattern book contained a range of glasswares including vases, bowls, lampshades, candlesticks, scent bottles, ashtrays and paperweights  and retailed at leading stores such as Liberty & Co. and Tiffany & Co.

Production of art glass at Moncrieff’s ceased during World War II. After the war, Moncrieff’s were reluctant to continue producing art glass, so in 1947, Salvador, with his younger sons Vincent and Augustine, set up Vasart  Glass. Paul Ysart continued to work at Moncrieff’s, producing a limited range of Monart glass and paperweights till 1961, when art glass production finally ceased.

By the 1950s, Vasart was proving to be popular, but in 1955 Salvador died, followed a year later by Augustine. This left Vincent running the business on his own. Production declined through the late 1950s and in 1964, Vasart was taken over by Teachers Whisky (for whom they were making squashed whisky bottle ashtrays) and was rebranded as Strathearn Glass.

Monart and Vasart

Monart and Vasart glass objects, such as paperweights, vases and dishes,  are characterised by vibrant marbled colours combined with subtle hues and inclusions of mica flecks and bubbles. Their decorative and distinctive style has made such objects popular with collectors, many examples of which can be seen at the Perth Museum .

External links
 Monart Glass, Vasart Glass and Strathearn (Contains many inaccuracies)
 John Moncrieff Ltd.
 Ysart Glass information site.
 All Scottish Glass, information only.

Further reading
 Ysart Glass  by F.E. Andrews, Ian Turner and  Alison J. Clarke (Volo Edition 1990)  
Scotland's Glass: 400 Years of Glassmaking 1610-2010  by Shiona Airlie and Brian J.R. Blench (Cortex Design 2009)  

British glass artists
1878 births
1955 deaths
Spanish emigrants to the United Kingdom